Events in the year 1483 in Norway.

Incumbents
Monarch: Hans

Events
 13 January – King Hans is elected King of Norway, two years after the death of his father and predecessor Christian I.
 20 July – King Hans is crowned King of Norway.

Arts and literature

Births

Deaths
Jon Svaleson Smør, nobleman and regent (born c. 1420).
Elise Eskilsdotter, noblewoman and pirate.

References

Norway